Giovanni Luigi Cecilio De Prà (28 June 1900 – 15 June 1979) was an Italian football goalkeeper.

Career
D Prà spent his entire club career with his hometown side Genoa C.F.C., playing more than 300 games over almost 15 years. 

D Prà competed at the 1924 and 1928 Summer Olympics with Italy, and won a bronze medal in 1928. as back up for Gianpiero Combi.

He started the first 4 matches in the Central European International Cup: 1927–30 campaign but also here lost his starter position to Gianpiero Combi after the summer of 1928. But remained a part of the successive Gold winning Italian national side.

Honours

Club
Genoa
Italian Football Championship: 1922–23, 1923–24

International 
Italy
 Central European International Cup: 1927–30
 Summer Olympics: Bronze 1928

References

1900 births
1979 deaths
Genoa C.F.C. players
Footballers from Genoa
Italian footballers
Association football goalkeepers
Serie A players
Italy international footballers
Footballers at the 1924 Summer Olympics
Footballers at the 1928 Summer Olympics
Olympic footballers of Italy
Olympic bronze medalists for Italy
Olympic medalists in football
Medalists at the 1928 Summer Olympics